Immunity may refer to:

Medicine
 Immunity (medical), resistance of an organism to infection or disease
 Immunity (journal), a scientific journal published by Cell Press

Biology
 Immune system

Engineering 
 Radiofrequence immunity describes how well an electronic circuit is protected against electromagnetic interference

Law
Legal immunity, the concept of a person or entity being immune from legal liability due to a special status
Absolute immunity, a type of immunity for government officials that confers total immunity when acting in the course of their duties
Amnesty law, a law that provides immunity for past crimes
Charitable immunity, immunity from liability granted to charities in many countries from the 19th century to the mid-20th century
Diplomatic immunity, agreement between sovereign governments to exclude diplomats from local laws
Immunity from prosecution (international law), exclusion of governments or their officials from prosecution under international law
Judicial immunity, immunity of a judge or magistrate in the course of their official duties
Parliamentary immunity, immunity granted to elected officials during their tenure and in the course of their duties
Qualified immunity, in the United States, immunity of individuals performing tasks as part of the government's actions
Sovereign immunity, the prevention of lawsuits or prosecution against rulers or governments without their given consent
Sovereign immunity in the United States, the legal privilege by which the American federal, state, and tribal governments cannot be sued
Spousal privilege, also called spousal immunity, protects a spouse from testifying against the defendant
State immunity, principle of international law that the government of a state is not amenable before the courts of another state
Witness immunity, immunity granted to a witness in exchange for testimony

Other
Immunity (Rupert Hine album)
Immunity (Jon Hopkins album)
Immunity (Clairo album)
Immunity (reality television), a condition which protects a contestant on a reality TV show from being kicked off the show in a given period
"Immunity", a song by Linda Perhacs from her album The Soul of All Natural Things